John Henry Marsalis (May 9, 1904 – June 26, 1971) was an American lawyer and politician who served one term as a U.S. Representative from Colorado from 1949 to 1951.

Early life and education 
Born in McComb, Pike County, Mississippi, Marsalis attended the public schools of McComb, Mississippi. He moved with his parents to Colorado Springs, Colorado, in 1922, reportedly for the benefit of his father's health. He graduated from Colorado Springs High School in 1923 and enrolled as a student at the University of Mississippi in 1925 and 1926. He graduated from the University of Colorado Law School in 1934.

Career 
He was admitted to the bar on March 14, 1935, and commenced the practice of law in Pueblo, Colorado. He was an investigator in district attorney's office in Pueblo in 1935 and 1936.

He entered the United States Army on May 11, 1942, assigned to the Weather Squadron, United States Army Air Forces, and was discharged on June 16, 1945. He was a sergeant while running for office in November 1944.

Political career 
Marsalis was elected district attorney, tenth judicial district of Colorado, in 1944 and took oath of office while on furlough on January 9, 1945. He assumed his duties upon release from Army and served until December 1948.

Marsalis was elected as a Democrat to the 81st Congress (January 3, 1949 – January 3, 1951). He was an unsuccessful candidate for reelection in 1950 to the 82nd Congress and for election in 1952 to the 83rd Congress.

He was appointed city attorney on December 15, 1952, and served in that capacity until elected district judge, tenth judicial district of Colorado, in November 1954. He served in that office until his retirement on February 28, 1962.

Personal life 
He was unmarried. He lived in Pueblo, Colorado, where he died June 26, 1971. He was interred in Roselawn Cemetery.

References

External links 
 

1904 births
1971 deaths
United States Army Air Forces non-commissioned officers
Democratic Party members of the United States House of Representatives from Colorado
Colorado state court judges
20th-century American lawyers
20th-century American politicians
20th-century American judges